Tomasz Rosiński (born 24 February 1984) is a former Polish handball player who played for the Polish national team.

References

External links
 Profile

1984 births
Living people
People from Ostrów Wielkopolski
Sportspeople from Greater Poland Voivodeship
Polish male handball players
Vive Kielce players